Blood antiquities are archaeological artefacts that have been plundered during conflicts and have been used to fund these wars. The looting of archaeological sites and the illicit trafficking of cultural property is, and has been, a common practice for terrorist groups in war zones. The pieces mostly end up on the black market, art galleries and antique shops in Europe and North America, or in millionaire private collections. The looting of blood antiquities especially affects the Middle East, because it is a very conflictive area and at the same time with a great density of archaeological sites.

By country

Iraq 

During the 2003 Invasion of Iraq, major robberies occurred at the National Museum of Iraq. Around 50,000 pieces were quantified, 25% of all the museum's heritage. 

The Archaeological Institute of America estimates that the revenue from looted antiquities is between $ 10 and $ 20 million annually. Terrorist and rebel groups have a long history of using stolen artifacts to finance their operations.

Syria 
During the Syrian Civil War, the Islamic State (ISIS) carried out the systematic looting of historical sites as the main form of profit, after the oil business. It is estimated that the ISIS has occupied around 4,500 sites and that the income derived from the antiquities trade amounts to an amount of 100,000,000 USD annually. The terrorist organization even has an internal institution dedicated to this illegal trade.

Yemen 
In Yemen, blood antiquities are financing the Civil War that the country has been suffering since 2015. The Antiquities Coalition (AC) published a report in 2019 in which it is estimated that, in the country's museums alone, 1,631 historical objects have disappeared. Namely, the Aden National Museum, the Taiz National Museum and the Zinjibar National Museum; that's not counting the many archaeological sites like Shabwa. The illicit trafficking of these pieces is one of the main forms of financing for terrorist groups such as Al-Qaeda in the Arabian Peninsula (AQAP) and the Houthi movement.

See also

References

External links 
 Official website of The Antiquities Coalition

Archaeological artifacts
Looting
Stolen works of art